Edi Danilo Guerra Pérez (born 11 December 1987) is a Guatemalan professional footballer who plays for Liga Nacional club Mixco.

International career
On 5 September 2019, Guerra scored four goals in Guatemala’s 10–0 blowout win over Anguilla in their first game of the CONCACAF Nations League.

Career statistics
Scores and results list Guatemala's goal tally first, score column indicates score after each Guerra goal.

References

1987 births
Living people
People from Petén Department
Guatemalan footballers
Association football forwards
Guatemala international footballers
Liga Nacional de Fútbol de Guatemala players
C.S.D. Municipal players
Cobán Imperial players
Deportivo Iztapa players